The Terry Fox Story is a 1983 Canadian-American biographical film of Canadian amputee and runner Terry Fox. It was written by Howard Hume, John Kastner and Rose Kastner, and directed by Ralph L. Thomas. The film stars Eric Fryer as Fox, Chris Makepeace as his brother Darrell, and Robert Duvall as Fox's publicist, Bill Vigars. The cast also includes Rosalind Chao, R. H. Thomson, Elva Mai Hoover, Michael Zelniker, Saul Rubinek and Patrick Watson.

The film was produced for HBO in the United States with Canadian co-producers. Although it was also released in Canadian and British theatres, it was the first television film ever made for a cable network.

The movie included the song "Runner", which was written by rock artist Ian Thomas in response to the coverage of Terry Fox's efforts.

Plot synopsis

Terry Fox, aspiring young Canadian athlete, learns that the pain in his right knee is due to a cancerous tumour, and his sporting career sadly comes to an end once he receives news that his leg has to be amputated. After a period of lengthy self-reflection, Terry falls in love with Rike Noda, played by Rosalind Chao, a Christian teacher for mentally disabled children, who helps Terry in his quest to regain his self-confidence.

Despite his mother's disapproval, on April 12, 1980 Terry dips his artificial limb into the Atlantic Ocean in St. John's, Newfoundland, and sets off on a Marathon of Hope across Canada to raise money for cancer research - the disease he has been battling for three years. That summer, the young man hobbles triumphantly into Toronto, cheered by over 10,000 Canadians who have adopted the 22-year-old as a national hero. On September 1, after over 3,000 miles, he collapses in Thunder Bay, Ontario and was hospitalized.

Fox is accompanied on his journey by his friend, Doug Alward, played by Michael Zelniker, who has to bear the burden of Fox's disappointment and anger when the marathon does not meet his expectations. Robert Duvall, starring as Bill Vigars, public relations officer for the Cancer Society of Canada, also accompanies Terry on his journey, and masterminds a publicity campaign which results in mass support for Terry's Marathon of Hope.

Cast
Eric Fryer as Terry Fox
Robert Duvall as Bill Vigars
Chris Makepeace as Darrell Fox
Rosalind Chao as Rika Noda
Michael Zelniker as Doug Alward
Elva Mai Hoover as Betty Fox
Frank Adamson as Rolly Fox
Marie McCann as Judith Fox

Production
The film was shot from August 23, 1982, to October 14, 1982, on a budget of $2,400,000.

Release
The rights to the film were pre-sold to the HBO and the CTV Television Network and aired on HBO on 22 May 1983. The film was theatrically released in 100 theatres on 27 May 1983.

Reception and awards
Variety wrote, "The opening section suffers slightly as a result of brevity and awkward dramatics. However, once the film moves into the actual run, it never loses its emotional grip or falters in pacing and involvement." Ron Base of the Toronto Star wrote, "That the Toronto producer Robert Cooper, director R. L. Thomas, and the screenwriter Ed Hume have been able to get truth onto the screen with so much life and intelligence is, to put it mildly, one of the season's most unexpected and refreshing surprises." David Macfarlane wrote in Maclean's that director Ralph Thomas "has chosen to avoid the risk of mystery; instead, he portrays the legend at its most obvious and simplistic level. Courage is a windswept sky. Tragedy is a swirl of violins. Banking on the cheap but correct assumption that tears already cried are waiting to be cried again, The Terry Fox Story is neither more nor less than a newspaper story that moves." Philip Wuntch wrote in The Boston Globe that the film was "well-acted and nicely directed" and "a solid piece of craftsmanship, but it still seems like a made-for-TV movie ... The long shots are not too expansive, and there's an awareness of the natural boundaries of the small screen." Halliwell's Film Guide said of the film: "True it may be, but dramatically this is a one-note film with endless pretty pictures of the countryside and in the foreground signs of failing health."

The Terry Fox Story won six awards, including Best Picture, at the 5th Genie Awards ceremony for Canadian film in 1984. Eric Fryer, the Scarborough amputee who played Fox, won Best Actor, and Michael Zelniker, won Best Supporting Actor for his role in playing Terry's best friend, Doug Alward.

 Best Picture
 Best Actor: Eric Fryer
 Best Supporting Actor: Michael Zelniker
 Best Sound (Joe Grimaldi, Bruce Carwardine, Austin Grimaldi and Glen Gauthier)
 Best Sound Editing: (same as above; tied with The Wars)
 Best Film Editing: (Ron Wisman)

The film was also nominated for Best Cinematography (Richard Ciupka) and Best Supporting Actress (Hoover). Duvall was nominated for Best Actor at the 1983 CableACE Awards, but did not win.

Despite its awards, the film was criticized by Fox's family for depicting him as ill-tempered.

Company Credits

 CTV Television Network 
 Home Box Office (HBO) 
 Robert Cooper Productions

Distributors

 Home Box Office (HBO) (1983) (USA) (TV) 
 Twentieth Century Fox (1983) (Canada) (theatrical) 
 Roadshow Home Video (1984) (Australia) (video)
 Video Network (Brazil) (VHS)

Film Rights Owner
 Home Box Office (HBO)

References

Works cited

External links

1983 films
1983 drama films
1983 television films
1980s biographical drama films
American track and field films
Athletics films
American biographical drama films
English-language Canadian films
Canadian biographical drama films
Biographical films about sportspeople
Biographical television films
Canadian drama television films
Cultural depictions of track and field athletes
Cultural depictions of Canadian men
Films about amputees
Drama films based on actual events
Best Picture Genie and Canadian Screen Award winners

Terry Fox
Films directed by Ralph L. Thomas
Films scored by Bill Conti
HBO Films films
1980s American films
1980s Canadian films
Films about disability